Walter Hampden Overton (1788December 24, 1845) was a U.S. Representative representing Louisiana's 3rd congressional district.

Personal life 

He was born near Louisa Court House, Virginia in 1788. His father Thomas Overton moved the family to North Carolina when Walter was an infant, and then moved to Tennessee in 1801.  Overton attended the common schools.

He joined the U.S. Army in 1808, and served in the War of 1812. He rose through the ranks to major in the Third Rifles on February 21, 1814.  Major Overton was brevetted a lieutenant colonel on December 23, 1814, for actions at the Battle of New Orleans and transferred to the Artillery Corps in May 1815 before resigning his commission on October 31, 1815.  Later, he was commissioned a major general of militia by the Louisiana Legislature.

Overton settled near Alexandria, Louisiana in Rapides Parish and served as a member of courthouse building commission in 1820 and 1821, a member of the Commission on Navigation of Bayou Rapides in 1824.

Political career 

Overton was elected as a Jacksonian Democrat — his father had served as Andrew Jackson's second in his duel with Charles Dickinson — to the Twenty-first Congress (March 4, 1829 – March 3, 1831). He succeeded three-term Whig William Leigh Brent, whose son James Fenwick Brent (1814-1847) married his daughter Laura Harriet Overton (1822-1844). General Overton served one term and was not a candidate for renomination in 1830.

He returned to his plantation near Alexandria, Louisiana where he died on December 24, 1845.

Death and legacy 

He was buried in McNutt Hill Cemetery in Rapides Parish. Thomas Overton Moore, Governor of Louisiana from 1860 to 1864, was his nephew; and the politician John Holmes Overton was his grandson. The politician Overton Brooks was his great-grandson.

References

 Congressional Biography

1788 births
1845 deaths
People from Louisa, Virginia
American militia generals
United States Army personnel of the War of 1812
Jacksonian members of the United States House of Representatives from Louisiana
19th-century American politicians